Joe Ihm (September 3, 1889 – March 13, 1951) was a member of the Missouri House of Representatives.

Biography
Ihm was born to Charles Frank and Mary Helen (Weber) Ihm on September 3, 1889 in Sinsinawa, Wisconsin. He attended school in Lamar, Missouri and Salisbury, Missouri. He became a farmer and later a service station operator. During World War II, he enlisted in the Reserve Military Forces. A Roman Catholic, Ihm was a member of the Knights of Columbus and the Society of the Holy Name.

On July 4, 1921, Ihm married Doris Browne. They had a son, Eldon, before her death on July 23, 1949. On August 1, 1950, Ihm married Agnes Weller. They also had a son, John, born after his father's death. Ihm died in a motor accident in Humansville, Missouri on March 13, 1951 and was buried in Lamar Heights, Missouri.

Political career
Ihm was a member of the House of Representatives in 1951, remaining a member until his death. Previously, he had been Treasurer of Barton County, Missouri from 1949 to 1950. He was a Republican.

References

External links
The Political Graveyard
Find a Grave

People from Grant County, Wisconsin
People from Lamar, Missouri
Catholics from Wisconsin
Catholics from Missouri
Republican Party members of the Missouri House of Representatives
County treasurers in the United States
Military personnel from Wisconsin
Military personnel from Missouri
American military personnel of World War II
Farmers from Missouri
1889 births
1951 deaths
Road incident deaths in Missouri
Burials in Missouri
20th-century American politicians